William Wallace Milroy (24 October 1929 – 21 June 1992) was an Australian rules footballer in the Victorian Football League.

Milroy made his debut for the Carlton Football Club in the Round 16 of the 1951 season. He left the Blues at the end of the 1956 season.

At Carlton he was "Best and Fairest" Player 1954. For a time he was also Vice Captain. His tally of 50 goals during that time affords evidence that he was a useful player while resting in the forward lines. A combination of immense determination, doggedness, and energy helped compensate to a large extent for any skill deficiencies.

Milroy died 21 June 1992.

External links
 Bill Milroy at Blueseum
 
 

1929 births
North Melbourne Football Club players
Carlton Football Club players
John Nicholls Medal winners
Australian rules footballers from Melbourne
1992 deaths
People from Carlton, Victoria